The Scooby-Doo/Dynomutt Hour is a 60-minute package show produced by Hanna-Barbera Productions in 1976 for ABC Saturday mornings. It marked the first new installments of the cowardly canine since 1973, and contained two segments: The Scooby-Doo Show and Dynomutt, Dog Wonder.

Production
The Scooby-Doo/Dynomutt Hour debuted on September 11, 1976. After two months, an additional 30 minutes were added to the hour-long series (to accommodate repeats of the first two CBS seasons of Scooby-Doo, Where Are You!), becoming the 90-minute Scooby-Doo/Dynomutt Show, which is how it remained from December 4, 1976 to September 3, 1977.

Like many animated series created by Hanna-Barbera in the 1970s, the show contained a laugh track created by the studio.

Episodes

Home media
The entire series was released on DVD as The Scooby-Doo/Dynomutt Hour: The Complete Series on Tuesday, March 7, 2006 by Warner Home Video (via Hanna-Barbera and Warner Bros. Family Entertainment). However, the episodes contained therein are not the original 1976 broadcast versions (which would have included only one opening and closing credits sequence per episode), but the separate syndicated versions of The Scooby-Doo Show and Dynomutt, Dog Wonder. Some of the original Scooby-Doo/Dynomutt Hour bridging sequences from 1976 (the opening to the Dynomutt segment and the original end credits, both featuring Scooby-Doo) were used periodically when Dynomutt, Dog Wonder aired as part of the USA Cartoon Express from spring 1984 to summer 1992 (the 1978 syndicated titles were shown as well).

See also
 List of Scooby-Doo media

References

External links
 
 The Scooby-Doo/Dynomutt Hour Episode Guide

Scooby-Doo package shows and programming blocks
1970s American animated television series
1976 American television series debuts
1976 American television series endings
American Broadcasting Company original programming
American children's animated comedy television series
American children's animated fantasy television series
American children's animated horror television series
American children's animated mystery television series
American children's animated superhero television series
American animated television spin-offs
Television series by Hanna-Barbera
Television series created by Joe Ruby
Television series created by Ken Spears